Chad M. McConnell (born October 13, 1970) is a retired professional baseball outfielder who played for the United States national baseball team in the 1992 Summer Olympics.

Biography
A native of Sioux Falls, South Dakota, McConnell attended O'Gorman Catholic High School and played American Legion Baseball for Post #15 in Sioux Falls. Out of high school, he was drafted by the Minnesota Twins in the 17th round (449th overall) of the 1989 Major League Baseball Draft, but he opted not to sign. He attended Creighton University, where he played college baseball for the Creighton Bluejays baseball team in the Missouri Valley Conference of the National Collegiate Athletic Association's (NCAA) Division I. In 1991, he played collegiate summer baseball with the Hyannis Mets of the Cape Cod Baseball League.

In 1992, McConnell was named a unanimous College Baseball All-American by the American Baseball Coaches Association, Baseball America, and Collegiate Baseball. That summer, he competed for the United States national baseball team in the Summer Olympics.

The Philadelphia Phillies drafted McConnell in the first round (13th overall) of the 1992 Major League Baseball Draft. He signed with the Phillies, receiving a $500,000 signing bonus. He played for the Phillies minor league organization until 1996.

References

External links

1970 births
Living people
Baseball players from South Dakota
Sportspeople from Sioux Falls, South Dakota
Baseball outfielders
Creighton Bluejays baseball players
Hyannis Harbor Hawks players
Olympic baseball players of the United States
Clearwater Threshers players
Reading Phillies players
Baseball players at the 1992 Summer Olympics
All-American college baseball players